Straw Men is a crime novel by the American writer Martin J. Smith set in Pittsburgh, Pennsylvania.

It tells the story of a madman known as the Scarecrow, who has served in prison eight years convicted of a vicious attack that left a rookie policewoman near death and unable to remember her past. When DNA evidence surfaces that frees him, Teresa Harnett must face the possibility that her flawed memory put the wrong man behind bars. Only Harnett's nemesis, psychologist Jim Christensen, can help to solve the case.

Sources
Contemporary Authors Online. The Gale Group, 2006. PEN (Permanent Entry Number):  0000132047.

External links
  Martin J. Smith website

2001 American novels
American crime novels
Novels set in Pittsburgh